Surgical Strike is a full motion video based game developed by The Code Monkeys and published by Sega of America for the Sega CD in 1995. An enhanced 32X CD version of the game was published by Tec Toy in Brazil in 1995.

Reception
The four reviewers of Electronic Gaming Monthly were divided over the Sega CD version. Two of them, while criticizing that the limited ammunition negatively affects the gameplay, praised the exciting action and the "seamless" transitions between full motion video sequences. The other two denounced the game as suffering from grainy, repetitive FMV which hampers the gameplay. They gave it an average score of 6 out of 10. GamePro gave it a mixed review, applauding the quality and intensity of the full motion video but criticizing the driving controls.

Next Generation reviewed the Sega CD version of the game, rating it two stars out of five.

References

External links
Surgical Strike at MobyGames

1995 video games
Full motion video based games
Interactive movie video games
Sega video games
Sega 32X games
Sega CD games
Single-player video games
Video games developed in the United Kingdom